The 1929–30 Duke Blue Devils men's basketball team represented Duke University during the 1929–30 men's college basketball season. The head coach was Eddie Cameron, coaching his second season with the Blue Devils. The team finished with an overall record of 18–2.

References 

Duke Blue Devils men's basketball seasons
Duke
1929 in sports in North Carolina
1930 in sports in North Carolina